This article lists feature-length films and full-length documentaries that were at least partly produced by the Bangladeshi film industry and were released in Bangladesh in 2016. Short films and made-for-TV films are not included. Films are ordered by domestic public release date, excluding film festivals, theatrical releases abroad, and sneak previews or screenings.

No films were released in June because of the observance of Ramadan.

Releases

January–March

April–June

July–September

October–December

See also 
 2016 in Bangladesh

Notes

References 

2016 in Bangladesh
B
 2016